Chidambaram is a city in southeast India. Chidambaram may also refer to:

People 
 C. T. Chidambaram, Indian politician
 M. A. Chidambaram, Indian industrialist and cricket administrator
 M. Ct. M. Chidambaram Chettyar, founder of the Indian Overseas Bank
 P. Chidambaram, Indian politician and former Finance Minister of India
 Rajagopala Chidambaram, nuclear physicist
 Sakthi Chidambaram, film director
 Chidambaram Subramaniam, Indian statesman

Places 
 Chidambaram division, a revenue division in the Cuddalore district of Tamil Nadu, India
 Chidambaram taluk, an administrative division of the Cuddalore district in India
 Erode V.O.Chidambaram Park Stadium, a football stadium in Tamil Nadu, India
 M. A. Chidambaram Stadium, a cricket stadium in Chennai, India
 Nataraja Temple, Chidambaram or Chidambaram temple, a Hindu temple in Chidambaram

Other uses 
 Chidambaram (film), a 1985 Malayalam film written, directed and produced by G. Aravindan